Lammhult is a locality situated in Växjö Municipality, Kronoberg County, Sweden with 1,459 inhabitants in 2010.
Lammhult has a long tradition with making furniture, presently production by designer brands are Norrgavel and Lammhult among several. It has also large retail stores for furniture and such items.

References 

Populated places in Kronoberg County
Populated places in Växjö Municipality
Värend